The German production and distribution company Tobis Film operated between 1929 and 1945. It was one of the four biggest German studios of this period along with Bavaria Film, Terra Film and UFA. Although the company ceased production following the collapse of Nazi Germany and the country's occupation by the Allies, several previously unreleased Tobis films were distributed in the postwar era.

The list does not included foreign-language films produced by Tobis as multiple-language versions of their German works. A number of Tobis films were handled by the subsidiary distributors Rota Film, Europa Film and Neue Deutsch Lichtspiel-Syndikat.

Musical Director: Kurt Adler

1920s

1930s

1940s

See also
 List of UFA films

Bibliography
 Bergfelder, Tim. International Adventures: German Popular Cinema and European Co-Productions in the 1960s. Berhahn Books, 2005.
 Kreimeier, Klaus. The Ufa Story: A History of Germany's Greatest Film Company, 1918-1945. University of California Press, 1999.

Tobis Film films
Tobis Film